Ten Italians for One German, is a 1962 Italian historical war drama film directed by Filippo Walter Ratti. It is a dramatization of the Fosse Ardeatine massacre.

Cast 

 Gino Cervi as Duke Alfonso di San Severino 
 Andrea Checchi as  Professor Marcello Rossi 
 Carlo D'Angelo as Herbert Kappler 
 Sergio Fantoni as  Gilberto di San Severino 
 Cristina Gaioni as  Mariella 
 Ivo Garrani as  Giovanni Ferroni 
 Gloria Milland as  Assunta aka Nena 
 Oliviero Prunas as  Hans Weiss 
 Nino Pavese as Pietro Caruso
 Loris Gizzi as The German Consul

References

External links

1962 films
1960s war drama films
Films set in Rome
Italian Campaign of World War II films
Italian war drama films
Films set in 1944
1962 drama films
Italian World War II films
1960s Italian-language films
1960s Italian films